Majdan Kozłowiecki is a village in the administrative district of Gmina Lubartów, within Lubartów County, Lublin Voivodeship, in eastern Poland.

This small village consists of buildings and farmsteads scattered along a country road that runs through a meadow, parallel to a stream. The village has a population of approximately 130.

Villages in Lubartów County